Chryseobacterium salipaludis  is a Gram-negative, aerobic, rod-shaped and non-motile bacteria from the genus of Chryseobacterium which has been isolated from sediments from the Indian Wild Ass Sanctuary in India.

References 

salipaludis
Bacteria described in 2018